Scott Lipsky and Jürgen Melzer were the defending champions but only Lipsky chose to defend his title, partnering Donald Young. Lipsky lost in the first round to Christian Harrison and Peter Polansky.

Evan King and Hunter Reese won the title after defeating Harrison and Polansky 6–1, 6–2 in the final.

Seeds

Draw

References
 Main Draw
 Qualifying Draw

Sarasota Open - Doubles
2018 Doubles